Code Lyoko: Fall of X.A.N.A. is the third video game based on the animated television series Code Lyoko, published by The Game Factory and released in June 2008.

Premise
In line with the plot of the same series, William is under XANA's control and being forced to fight against his will. Like its predecessor, the game vaguely follows the plot of Season 4, although it is comparatively shorter. The game starts off with the heroes already knowing what Replikas are, and they start to hunt their supercomputers down. Unlike Code Lyoko: Quest for Infinity, Jeremy mentions that there are hundreds of Replikas. Another differentiation is that the Kolossus appears; its position is the final boss of the game.

Gameplay

Unlike the previous two games, Code Lyoko: Fall of X.A.N.A. uses an RPG-style interface that combines turn-based and real-time combat. The game also has a multiplayer mode, wherein players can face each other in various forms of battle.

Reception

Fall of X.A.N.A. received "mixed" reviews according to the review aggregation website Metacritic.

See also
 Code Lyoko (video game)
 Code Lyoko: Quest for Infinity

References

External links
 

2008 video games
Fall of X.A.N.A.
Nintendo DS games
Nintendo DS-only games
Neko Entertainment games
Role-playing video games
Video games developed in France
Video games based on animated television series
Video games about parallel universes
The Game Factory games
Multiplayer and single-player video games